Trevor Roy Samuels (born 15 December 1967) is a former Jamaican cricketer who represented the Jamaica national team in West Indian domestic cricket. He played as a right-arm pace bowler.

Samuels represented the West Indies at the 1988 Youth World Cup in Australia, featuring in all eight of the team's matches. He took nine wickets (with a best of 2/17 against India), which ranked him behind only Sam Skeete and Rajindra Dhanraj amongst his teammates. Later in 1988, Samuels made his first and only first-class appearance for Jamaica against Lancashire, an English county team touring as part of its pre-season preparation. Samuels was wicketless.

References

External links
Player profile and statistics at Cricket Archive
Player profile and statistics at ESPNcricinfo

1967 births
Living people
Jamaica cricketers
Jamaican cricketers
People from Westmoreland Parish